Giorgi Tskhovrebadze may refer to:
 Giorgi Tskhovrebadze (businessman)
 Giorgi Tskhovrebadze (handballer)